The 1918–19 Duquesne Dukes men's basketball team represents Duquesne University during the 1918–19 college men's basketball season. The head coach was Eugene McGuigan coaching the Dukes in his fifth year. The team finished the season with an overall record of 4–6.

Schedule

|-

References

Duquesne Dukes men's basketball seasons
Duquesne